Markus J. Buehler is an American materials scientist and engineer at the Massachusetts Institute of Technology (MIT), where he holds the endowed McAfee Professorship of Engineering chair. He is a member of the faculty at MIT's Department of Civil and Environmental Engineering, where he directs the Laboratory for Atomistic and Molecular Mechanics (LAMM), and also a member of MIT's Center for Computational Science and Engineering (CCSE) in the Schwarzman College of Computing. His scholarship spans science to art, and he is also a composer of experimental, classical and electronic music, with an interest in sonification. He has given several TED talks about his work.

Between 2013 and 2020, he served as the Head of the Department of Civil and Environmental Engineering at MIT. His research and teaching activities center on the application of a computational materials science approach to understand functional material properties in biological and synthetic materials, specifically focused on mechanical properties and nano-engineering of multiscale materials. 

His work incorporates materials science, engineering, mathematics and the establishment of links between natural materials with the arts through the use of category theory. 

Working at the interface of art and science, he is also a composer of music with an interest in sonification, whereby he developed a method to translate material structure into musical form and vice versa, realizing a materialization of sonic information in biomaterials protein design. He developed  the materiomusical compositional technique. 

In 2020, he set the pathogen of COVID-19 to music, exemplifying a relationship between art and science.

Education and career
Before joining MIT in 2005, he served as the Director of Multiscale Modeling and Software Integration at Caltech’s Materials and Process Simulation Center in the Division of Chemistry and Chemical Engineering. He received a Ph.D. in chemistry from the University of Stuttgart and the Max Planck Institute for Metals Research after obtaining an M.S. in Engineering Mechanics from Michigan Tech, and undergraduate studies in Chemical and Process Engineering at the University of Stuttgart.

Research
Buehler has a background in materials science, engineering science and applied mechanics. Buehler's research focuses on bottom-up simulation of structural and mechanical properties of biological, bioinspired and synthetic materials across multiple scales, with a specific focus on materials failure from a nanoscale and molecular perspective, and on developing a fundamental understanding of how functional material properties are created in natural, biological and synthetic materials. He is best known for the use of simple computational models to explain complex materials phenomena in biology and engineering from a bottom-up perspective. His work on 3D printing explores the integrated computational-experimental design of novel materials, including the use of AI and AR/VR, and immersive modeling.

His recent work has focused on applying a computational materials science approach to study materials failure in biological systems, including the investigation of material breakdown in a variety of diseases and other extreme conditions across multiple time- and length-scales. His key contributions lie in the field of deformation and failure of structural protein materials such as collagen and silk, where his work revealed universal material design paradigms that enable protein materials to provide enhanced and diverse functionality despite limited resources (energy, material volume, weak building blocks such as H-bonds, etc.), and demonstrated how these mechanisms break down under extreme conditions and disease (impact, trauma, mutations, flaws, etc.). 

The impact of his work has been the establishment of the universality-diversity paradigm, explaining how multifunctionality (diversity) of material properties in biology is achieved by changing structural arrangements of few (universal) constituents rather than inventing new building blocks, or through reliance of the quality of building blocks. Some of Buehler's current work involves the use of ologs, a category-theoretic framework for knowledge representation, to encode the structure-function relationships inherent in hierarchical materials.

Buehler has published more than 450 articles, with more than 30,000 citations, on theoretical and computational modeling of materials using various types of simulation methods, a monograph on atomistic modeling, a book on Biomateriomics, several book chapters, and has given hundreds of invited lectures, keynote talks and plenary speeches around the world. His work is published in peer-reviewed scientific journals such as Nature, Nature Materials, PNAS, Science Advances, Advanced Materials, Royal Society Interface, and many others.

In a recent Stanford University study, he has been named as one of the world's highly ranked researchers in 2020, within the top 0.09% of all researchers in the nanoscience category. He collaborates broadly with experimental researchers in the United States, Europe and Asia. He serves as a PI and co-PI on numerous research grants, including several interdisciplinary research projects funded by the National Science Foundation, Department of Defense, National Institutes of Health (NIH), and many other organizations as well as industrial partners.

Teaching
His teaching at MIT focus on engineering mechanics and modeling and simulation, and on introducing undergraduate and graduate students to computational research. He teaches professional educational courses in areas of materials design, machine learning, and additive manufacturing.

He has been involved in teaching MIT subjects 3.021J Introduction to Modeling and Simulation, 1.978 From nano to macro: Introduction to atomistic modeling techniques, 1.545 Atomistic Modeling of Materials and Structures and 1.050 Engineering Mechanics I. Buehler collaborates with MIT's IS&T department within the scope of the initiative "Bringing Research Tools into the Classroom", where is developing tools to enable simple use of multiscale simulation tools in teaching and education of undergraduate and graduate students. He is also actively participating in MIT's Undergraduate Research Opportunities Program (UROP), where he serves as a faculty mentor. He is a faculty advisor in the MIT Summer Research Program and served as faculty advisor of the Everett Moore Baker Memorial Foundation.

Service
Buehler serves as editor or a member of the editorial board of several international journals including PLoS ONE, International Journal of Applied Mechanics, Biophysical Journal, Acta Mechanica Sinica, Journal of the Mechanical Behavior of Biomedical Materials, Journal of Engineering Mechanics, Journal of Nanomechanics and Micromechanics, and the Journal of Computational and Theoretical Nanoscience. Since 2011 he serves as a co-Editor in Chief of BioNanoScience, a journal he co-founded. He was elected to the editorial board of the Journal of the Royal Society Interface in 2012.

He is the former chair of the Biomechanics Committee at the Engineering Mechanics Institute of the ASCE, Co-chair of the NanoEngineering in Medicine and Biology Steering Committee at the ASME, a member of the U.S. National Committee on Biomechanics, and participates in several other committees at ASME including the Committee on Mechanics in Biology and Medicine. He is also active in the Materials Research Society as volunteer writer for the MRS Bulletin, organizer of MRS symposiums, and through his involvement in the MRS Graduate Student Award program. Since 2010 he serves as the Director of the MIT-Germany Program (MISTI Germany). He is the Editor-in-Chief of the Journal of the Mechanical Behavior of Biomedical Materials.

Awards and recognitions
Buehler received the National Science Foundation CAREER Award, the United States Air Force Young Investigator Award, the Navy Young Investigator Award, and the DARPA Young Faculty Award. Buehler was invited to the National Academy of Engineering-Frontiers in Engineering symposium of the National Academy of Engineering. In 2023, he was elected to the National Academy of Engineering. In 2009, his work was recognized by the Presidential Early Career Award for Scientists and Engineers (PECASE). He received the 2010 Harold E. Edgerton Faculty Achievement Award,  the 2010 ASME Sia Nemat-Nasser Award, the 2011 Thomas J.R. Hughes Young Investigator Award and the 2011 Rossiter W. Raymond Memorial Award. In 2011 he received the inaugural Leonardo da Vinci Award from EMI. His work was recognized with several other awards including the Alfred Noble Prize. In 2021, he received the ASME Drucker Medal.

References

General references

List of publications at LAMM
NPR story on 3D printing and spider webs
Forbes Magazine article on protein design
Science Careers: Winning Strategies: Advice from PECASE Winners
There’s a symphony in the antibody protein the body makes to neutralize the coronavirus
AMERIKAS HOCHSCHULE M.I.T.: Die Mühen der Spitze
Unraveling silks’ secrets
Learning from failure
MIT probes secret to bone's strength
NBC article on mussel-inspired building designs
Wall Street Journal article on coronavirus work
National Academy of Engineering - Frontiers of Engineering Symposium
Math model may help to study collagen ailments
Classic FM radio station article & broadcast
Think small! Think quickly! Atomistic model helps students visualize nanoscale problems
Buehler appointed to the Institute-wider endowed chair professorship at MIT
Speed plays crucial role in breaking protein's H-bonds
MIT researcher sees big impact of little cracks
S. Cranford, M. Buehler, Materiomics: biological protein materials, from nano to macro, Nanotechnology, Science and Applications, Vol. 3, pp. 127–148, 2010.
Going nature one better
M.J. Buehler, Tu(r)ning weakness to strength, Nano Today, Vol. 5(5), pp. 379–383, 2010.
Buehler to receive inaugural Leonardo da Vinci Award
MIT-Germany Program and MIT-Germany Seed Fund
Researchers link patterns seen in spider silk, melodies
The Beethoven connection
Markus Buehler named head of Department of Civil and Environmental Engineering
Spider web music: An inspiring harmony of art and science
Spider web music: Translating proteins into music, and back
Materiomusic: Setting coronavirus and AI inspired proteins to music

External links
Laboratory for Atomistic and Molecular Mechanics at MIT
website at MIT
Group members of the Laboratory for Atomistic and Molecular Mechanics at MIT
Publications at LAMM
LAMM Twitter site for news and announcements
Markus Buehler Twitter site
Markus Buehler Instagram site
Portfolio of materiomusical work at MIT
 Google Scholar

Living people
MIT School of Engineering faculty
21st-century American engineers
American nanotechnologists
American scientists
American materials scientists
American composers
1977 births
Michigan Technological University alumni
Members of the United States National Academy of Engineering